Ashwanth Ashokkumar is an Indian child actor who works in Tamil-language films. In 2016, he participated in the show Junior Super Star in Zee Tamil and won the title. He is known for his role as Rasukutty in  Super Deluxe (2019).

Career 
In 2016, he participated in the show Junior Super Star, a show which tests kids' acting capabilities, on Zee Tamil along with Lisha. He won the season title of the show. Lisha and Ashwanth went on to star in Zee Tamil's television series, Mella Thirandhathu Kadhavu. He starred in Airaa (2019) before getting his breakthrough in Super Deluxe that same year. In Super Deluxe, he played Rasukutty, a child who still cares for his father, Manickam (Vijay Sethupathi) after he declares himself as a woman, Shilpa. He landed the role after the makers saw his performance on Junior Super Star. Ashwanth was offered a role in Mersal (2017), but didn't take the offer. He played supporting roles in several films including Thambi (2019) before playing one of the lead roles in God Father (2020). In 2020, he directed a children's stop-motion web series titled Ondipulli. He has given a voice-over during the episodes in addition to writing the series. His upcoming films include Jagame Thandhiram and an untitled film with Balaji Sakthivel.

Filmography

Films

Television

Web series

Awards and nominations

References

External links 

Living people
Child actors in Tamil cinema
21st-century Indian male child actors
Year of birth missing (living people)
Zee Cine Awards winners